Hawthorne is a city in Alachua County, Florida, United States, incorporated in 1881. Indigenous peoples of the Americas had been living in the area since around 100 CE; Hawthorne grew around their trading trails. Throughout its history, Hawthorne has been known for its agriculture, railroad, and rural lifestyle.

History

People have been living in the Hawthorne area since the mid-Woodland period; a Cades Pond culture (100–600 CE) mound is near the city, and an Alachua culture (600–1700 CE) campsite was found in Hawthorne with aboriginal ceramics and lithics. Timucua-speaking natives were living in North Florida when the Spanish arrived during the 16th century. Natives in Alachua County were allied with Chief Potano, and those in Palatka were allied with Chief Utina. In 1774, William Bartram traveled between western Alachua County and the Palatka area on what he called an "old Spanish highway", an "old Indian and trading trail" which passed through the Hawthorne area. Hawthorne's history is tied to its crossroads.

A road between Micanopy and Palatka via the Hawthorne area appears on an 1837 map. The Pleasant Grove Baptist Church was founded at this time, and a post office opened at the mill in 1854. In 1869, the area's first school opened in a log cabin.

Phosphate was discovered near Hawthorne during the late 1870s. Near the same time, the first subdivision, the Town of Hawthorn, was platted. The area had been previously known as Jamestown—named after James M. Hawthorn. A second subdivision, Waits Crossing, was platted in 1881. The subdivisions provided north–south and east–west rights-of-way, which brought rail service. Track was first laid by the Peninsula Railroad in Hawthorne in 1879 for a north–south line intended to connect Waldo and Ocala. Near the same time, track laid by the Florida Southern Railroad reached Hawthorne; its east–west line was intended to connect Palatka and Gainesville. Each railroad company had a depot in the Hawthorne area, about a half-mile apart. A Hawthorn post office was established in 1880, and its spelling was changed to Hawthorne in 1950.

In 1881, 36 years after Florida became a state, the state legislature created the municipal corporation of Hawthorne. Florida Southern began selling land granted to it by the state almost a decade after the railroads were built, including land in Hawthorne described as "in the heart of a famous vegetable region ... large public school, churches, stores, hotels, three cotton gins, wagon repair shop." At this time, Hawthorne was known for its hunting and fishing and "Northern sportsmen frequented the area to enjoy" it. Sportsmen could stay at William Shepard Moore's hotel; he served breakfast early and had hunting dogs, guides, and horses available.

During the 1880s many orange groves were planted in the Hawthorne area, but after the 1894 Great Freeze ruined citrus trees, growers switched to vegetables; the area became known for Sea Island cotton (Pima cotton) around the turn of the 20th century although it had been grown there since at least the early 1880s. The boll weevil halted the cotton trade, however, and Hawthorne diversified into brickmaking, other agriculture, turpentine production, and railroad work. Because two rail lines crossed in the city, it became a transfer point; there was no passenger station, however, and travelers had to walk (or ride) to the connecting line's depot. The Florida state railroad commission declared that the depots were inadequate to accommodate the "traveling public", and required the rail companies to build a segregated union passenger station in Hawthorne by November 1912. Hawthorne was a bustling community in 1913 with a cotton gin, a bank, four general stores, a drug store, three hotels, and two furniture stores.

The city experienced a boom during the 1920s; by late in the decade, Hawthorne had a bank, high school, ice and electric plants, a Western Union, a Railway Express Agency, and a telephone exchange. Although the city suffered during the Great Depression, daily rail service continued; Highway 20 was paved, and a bridge was built over the railroad tracks. The area remained an agricultural center.

The original city hall burned during the mid-to-late 1930s and was replaced by a "white stucco building with Mediterranean influence", which was Hawthorne's city hall until 2018. That year, the city hall moved down the street to an old bank building on the corner of County Road 2082, and the old city-hall building began use as a community center.

During the 1940s, agriculture declined because the land had not been replenished. The pulpwood industry began when National Container (a box company later purchased by Owens-Illinois) bought  in the area. While there was not much growth after World War II, Hawthorne was still a center for hunting and fishing. Little growth occurred in the 1950s and 1960s; Hawthorne was known for its lima beans, and more farmland was sold to lumber companies. Trees were still tapped for turpentine before that industry ended in the late 1950s. US 301, built during the early 1960s, bypassed downtown Hawthorne to reduce driving times.

Growth revived somewhat during the 1970s. As automobiles became the dominant means of transportation, passenger trains and buses stopped serving the city. Many residents began commuting to Gainesville to work after local industries declined. The area's rural lifestyle became appreciated during the 1980s, although local jobs still existed at sand mines, chicken ranches, and plywood mills. Since the 1980s, Hawthorne has experienced little population growth.

The city of Hawthorne annexed approximately 1,300 acres owned by Plum Creek Land Company in 2015.

Geography

Hawthorne is on the eastern boundary of Alachua County, and a portion of the city borders the Alachua–Putnam county line.

Demographics

The 2020 census listed the population of Hawthorne as 1,478. The 2010 census listed 1,417 people, 561 households, and 357 families residing in the city. The city's racial makeup was 52.4 percent white, 45.3 percent black or African American, 0.1 percent native American, 0.3 percent Asian, 0.5 percent other races, and 1.5 percent two (or more) races. Hispanics or Latinos of any race were two percent of the population.

Of the 561 households, 31.6 percent had children under age 18 living with them; 38.3 percent were married couples living together, 21.0 percent had a female householder with no husband present, and 36.4 percent were non-families. Individuals made up 31.4 percent of all households, 12.0 percent of whom were age 65 or older. The average household size was 2.534, and the average family size was 3.15.

By age, 23.2 percent were under age 18; 2.4 percent were 18 to 21, 52.9 percent were 21 to 62, and 20.1 percent were age 62 or older; the median age was 41.5 years. For every 100 females, there were 86.2 males;  for every 100 females over 18, there were 86.6 males.

According to the Census Bureau, median household income in the city was $37,500 and median family income was $46,875. Hawthorne's per capita income was $14,353. About 25.5 percent of families and 29.0 percent of the population were below the poverty line, including 34.8 percent of those under age 18 and 16.6 percent of those aged 65 or over.

Government

Hawthorne is chartered as a commission–manager form of government. The charter officers are the city commission, with five commissioners, a mayor, and a vice-mayor. A city manager is responsible to the commission for the administration of all city affairs.

The mayor of Hawthorne is Jacquelyn Randall.

Attractions

Hawthorne obtained  surrounding Little Orange Creek (where a historic mill operated) in 2011. The Little Orange Creek Nature Park opened in 2017. Managed by the city, it is divided into two sections. The preserve has public trails for hiking, bicycling, and horseback riding.

The city also owns and maintains Lindsey Phillips Park, off US Highway 301. The park (on Johnson Lake) has a boat ramp, fishing pier, playground, and picnic facilities.

Several conservation areas are south and west of Hawthorne. Immediately adjacent to the city is the over- Lochloosa Wildlife Management Area. Its Cross Creek Trail is part of the Great Florida Birding and Wildlife Trail. Lochloosa Wildlife Management Area provides opportunities for hiking, bicycling, horseback riding, hunting, fishing, canoeing, and boating.

Marjorie Kinnan Rawlings Historic State Park, about fourteen miles southwest of Hawthorne, maintains the "authentic Florida cracker homestead" where Rawlings lived and wrote her Pulitzer Prize-winning books. Although Rawlings did not live in Hawthorne, she used the Hawthorne post office and received mail addressed to "Hawthorn".

Sports

The city owns and maintains Hawthorne Athletic Park, which has four dual-use baseball-softball fields, a multi-purpose field, a playground, concession stand, and picnic facility. A non-profit organization, Hawthorne Youth Sports, offers a variety of sports for children in the area: baseball, softball, t-ball, tackle football, soccer, basketball, and cheerleading. The Hawthorne Hornets football team, coached by former NFL player Cornelius Ingram, plays at the Hawthorne High School football stadium. In 2018, the city opened a wellness center adjacent to Hawthorne Athletic Park; most of the gym members are senior citizens.

Infrastructure

Transportation

The city sits at the intersection of US Highway 301 and Florida State Road 20. Love's Travel Stops opened a truck stop on US 301, less than a half-mile north of the intersection with Florida State Road 20, in 2016.

CSX Transportation owns the north–south rail line which runs through Hawthorne, and operates a station. The line, part of the Wildwood Subdivision, is used for freight. Its Edgar spur runs from Hawthorne to Edgar (near Interlachen), and the 1912 railroad station is used as a business.

The Gainesville-Hawthorne State Trail connects Gainesville to Hawthorne with a sixteen-mile, paved trail. The trail runs through conservation areas in Alachua County that features wetlands, upland hammocks, and pine flatwoods, and can be used for walking, cycling, and (in parts) horseback riding. It was created through the Rails-to-Trails program, which converted the abandoned railroad between Hawthorne and Gainesville to a recreational trail.

Utilities

The Department of Public Works provides solid-waste pickup (including recyclable items), potable water, and a sewer system with wastewater services. Electrical power is provided by Florida Power & Light and the Clay Electric Cooperative.

Health care

Medical services are provided by Azalea Health, which operates a clinic in the city.
Fifteen hospitals are within  of Hawthorne. The closest are in Gainesville: Shands Hospital, North Florida/South Georgia Veteran Affairs Health Care System, and the North Florida Regional Medical Center. To the east, Putnam Community Medical Center is available for Hawthorne residents who are closer to Palatka. Florida Hospital Ocala and Ocala Regional Medical Center are in Ocala, south of Hawthorne.

In August 2018, Shands Hospital was the only Level I trauma center in Alachua and its eight adjacent counties. Ocala Regional Medical Center in Marion County and Orange Park Medical Center in Clay County offer Level II trauma services.

Emergency services

Law enforcement in Hawthorne is provided by the Alachua County Sheriff's Office, and emergency services are provided by Alachua County Fire Rescue. In 2015, Alachua County Fire Rescue Station 62 moved into a renovated station in Hawthorne. The station (number 25) houses a fire engine, rescue ambulance, brush truck, and tanker.

Education

Hawthorne is served by the Alachua County Public Schools, which operates Shell Elementary School and Hawthorne Middle/High School. The Alachua County Library District has a branch library in the city. The elementary school was named after Chester Shell, who spearheaded a campaign to open a school for black children in Hawthorne. The school for black students opened in 1922 as Hawthorne High School. Schools at that location were known as Hawthorne High School, Shell High School, Shell Middle School, and Shell Elementary School.

Media

Television stations available over the air in Hawthorne are WUFT PBS, WOGX Fox, WCJB-TV ABC, WGFL CBS, and WYME-CD MeTV. There are 22 AM and FM radio stations within a  radius of the city. The Gainesville Sun, The Independent Florida Alligator, and Alachua County Today are local newspapers.

Notable people

 Bo Diddley, musician
 James B. Edwards, Governor of South Carolina
 Cornelius Ingram, National Football League player
 D. R. "Billy" Matthews, Congressman from North Florida (1953–1965)

Notes

References

Sources

 for zip code 32640

External links

Hawthorne Branch Library
Former official website
Student project from 1997

Cities in Alachua County, Florida
Gainesville metropolitan area, Florida
Populated places established in 1881
Cities in Florida
1881 establishments in Florida